Catherine Enjolet (born  in Paris) is a French novelist and essayist.

Biography
Enjolet is an author and a full professor of French Literature. She formerly taught Communication and Cultural Studies in the United States as well as at the Sorbonne in Paris, France. She is also a screenwriter and director, she was contracted by the INA (National Institute for Broadcasting) to study the relationships between literature and broadcasting in France. In 1990, Enjolet created the non-governmental organization Parrains Par Mille, which organizes voluntary sponsorship for isolated children "next door", to enable them to receive educational and emotional support.

Literature Prizes
 Sélection des Lectrices de ELLE - 1997
 Prix Georges Brassens - 1995
 Prix du Jeune Cinéma Français - 1980

Awards
 Chevalier des Arts et Lettres - 2015 (Officer of arts and letters)
 Chevalier de la légion d'honneur - 2008 (Officer of legend and Honor)
 Prix Figaro Humanitaire - 2005
 Prix Trofémina - 2005
 Prix Entreprise Citoyenne du Monde - CLARINS  - 2004
 Prix  Radio France - 1995

Novels
 Rousse comme personne, Stock, 1990 (prix Georges Brassens)
 Princesse d'ailleurs, Éditions Phébus, 1997
 Mémoires d'enfance, Phébus, short stories (collective work), 2008
 Under Silence, Phébus, 2012, French Academy Creation Prize
 Under Shadows, Phébus, 2014,  Paris Literature Prize 
 Nina, Ed Lattes, 2016

Essays
 En danger de silence, Robert Laffont, 1999
 L'amour et ses chemins, Pocket, with Jacques Salomé, 2000
 Les liens du sens, Ramsay, 2003
 Ceux qui ne savent pas donner ne savent pas ce qu'ils perdent, JC Lattès, 2006
 Conversations solidaires, édition Rue de L'Echiquier, 2009
. Defense for Affective Adoption ed Pocket 2011

Album
 Une étoile pour chacun, Belin, 2006

References

Member of Jury
 'Member of literary book award'
 'Member of PARIS' book award
 'Présidente of Morocco literary Prize'
 'Presidente of international  literary Escapes  et conferences - Le Figaro Newspaper'
 Member of jury of le literary  Summer Novel Prize

External links
 Parrains par' mille, parrainage d'enfants en France 
 Personal website of l'écrivain 

1953 births
Living people
Writers from Paris
20th-century French novelists
21st-century French novelists
20th-century French essayists
Chevaliers of the Légion d'honneur
21st-century French essayists